The Double Reduction Policy (Chinese: 双减政策; pinyin: shuāng jiǎn zhèng cè) is an attempt by China to reduce homework and after-school tutoring pressure on primary and secondary school students, reduce families' spending on expensive tutoring, and improve compulsory education.

On 24 July 2021, Opinions on Further Reducing the Homework Burden and Off-Campus Training Burden of Students in Compulsory Education was issued by the Central Committee of the Chinese Communist Party and the State Council of the People's Republic of China. The policy was prompted by problems with high-stakes exam-oriented education including the physical and mental health of students (e.g., lack of sleep, obesity, anxiety, and suicide).

Background Reason of Policy Formulation: Adolescent's Academic Stress in China

Heavy Time Investment in Study 
The time investment of Chinese adolescents in their studies is among the highest in the world. Shanghai students aged 12 to 14 spend 9.8 hours a day on-campus studying. Chinese students' average study time commitment is 55 hours per week, far beyond an international average of 44 hours.

Due to the competitive pressure of the Senior High School Entrance Examination, Junior High School students in China's first-tier cities improve their school academic performance or academic competition through extracurricular tutoring. In Shanghai, more than 45 percent of students attend math tutoring classes at least four hours a week, and more than 20 percent even invest more than four hours in attending tutoring classes. Students from rural areas attend four-hour "evening sessions" offered by boarding schools. In Chinese high schools, “evening sessions" don't end until 11 pm. And Chinese adolescents' tutoring hours during weekends increased from 0.7 hours to 2.1hours from 2005 to 2015.

Lack of Sleep and Obesity 
As students need to finish their homework after cram school, students' sleeping time get affected and lack of sleep becomes a common trend among Chinese adolescents. There is a positive correlation between the homework amount during weekdays and the proportion of overweight Chinese adolescents. However, sleep duration on both weekdays and weekends shows a negative correlation with adolescent students. The obesity rate among Chinese children aged 5 to 19 exceeded 18 percent in 2016, almost five times the obesity rate (4 percent) in 1975. 7–9 years old young Chinese primary school students have the most significant obesity problem, "5.7% for boys and 8% for girls". 19.6 percent of Grade 1 Chinese students are overweight. And the obesity rate of primary school students in grades 1-3 increase faster than students in grades 4–6.

Suicide and Mental Health Problem 
Suicide is the highest cause of death among Chinese teenagers. Seventy-nine primary and secondary school suicides in 2013 were linked to the pressure of exam-oriented education in China and fierce competition in schools. Sixty-three percent of the suicides occurred in the second semester, which was closer to Senior High School Entrance Examination and "gaokao" (National College Entrance Examination). Depression caused by stress is one main factor in suicide, and more than 10% of Chinese adolescents have depression problem.  Thirty-three percent of suicides are related to family conflicts, which is even higher than the suicide rate directly caused by study stress (twenty-two percent). Moreover, China currently does not provide adequate psychological resources for students with psychological problems and cause difficulty for students solving mental health problems.

Purpose of Policy Implementation

Alleviate Parental Educational Anxiety and Pressure 
Chinese families, influenced by Confucianism and “huge income gaps linked to educational credential”, consider their children's academic performance as an effective means of achieving upward social mobility. Parents' high expectations are also linked to the one-child policy, implemented in 1979. Because Chinese families have only one offspring and the Chinese workplace is increasingly competitive, parents place extreme demands on their child to succeed academically. Because of the psychological feeling of "upper-class envy" and "lower-class fears" among Chinese parents, families tend to spend significant educational expenditures, especially on expensive after-school tutoring.

The high cost of education leads to significant economic pressure on Chinese families. This is despite the fact that Chinese governments fund compulsory education and school tuition is free. Middle-class parents invested the most among all families in their children's education. Middle-class parents want to build 'child capital' by increasing financial investment in after-school tutoring.

Teachers' requirements also lead to extra burdens on Chinese parents. In China, some teachers will obligate parents to help check and supervise their children's' homework. 91.2% of Chinese parents do so. Those that fail can be reprimanded by teachers and accused of irresponsibility, leading to stress on the family and their relationships. The Double Reduction Policy aims to alleviate this financial burden by strictly regulating the tutoring industry and to lessen the pressure on families. It calls for the development of "home-school cooperative education", which guides parents toward reasonable expectations for their children while the school provides after-school supervision to reduce parents' anxiety about tutoring classes and home supervision.

Student Centered Education: Relieve Student Pressure and Offer High Quality Compulsory Education 
Opinions on Further Reducing the Homework Burden and Off-Campus Training Burden of Students in Compulsory Education specifies the following policy measures to ease students' learning burden: Clarify the total amount of homework by category. Schools should ensure that there is no written homework to be done at home for 1st and 2nd grades, but fixed practice can be appropriately on campus; the average time for completion of written homework for 3rd through 6th grades is not to exceed 60 minutes, and the average time for completion of written homework for middle school is not to exceed 90 minutes.
 Increase the quality of homework design. Give play to the diagnostic, consolidation, and analytic functions of homework, including homework design in the education and research system, systematically design fundamental homework that comports with the traits and learning principles for the age and that embody the orientation towards whole-person education. Encourage the assignment of tiered, flexible, and personalized homework, resolutely overcome mechanical and ineffective homework and put an end to repetitive and punitive homework.The double reduction policy emphasizes the student-oriented learning mode of teaching students according to their aptitude. The homework amount of primary and secondary school students has been greatly reduced. And the problem of lack of sleep and mental health problem has been slightly relieved after controlling homework amount. The rate of student with depression dropped from 9.9 percent to 9.4 percent, while student having anxiety dropped from 7.4 percent to 7.1 percent. The proportion of primary and secondary school students able to complete their homework at school has risen from 46 percent to more than 90 percent, so adolescents now have more time to achieve work-life balance.

The double reduction policy has further realized "the cultural approach". Schools now offer courses across a broader range of interests. Schools respect every students’ “differentiated learning needs”, personal strengths and individuality, so students can achieve well-rounded development through “after-school services”.

Primary and junior high schools in China are also explicitly required to outlaw rankings of students' academic performance. The Ministry of Education has emphasized students' personality rights through the double reduction policy, so as to avoid the negative psychological pressure caused by the public examination ranking. Banning rankings protects students' psychological self-esteem, especially for adolescents who are still in a fragile growth stage. The abolition of rankings and “frequent formal exams” has ensured students' enthusiasm for learning and changed China's long grade-centered and test-oriented education system.

Public Sentiment On Social Media 
Chinese netizens have publicly shared their personal views on the double reduction policy, showing the following patterns:

 Among the positive topics of public concern on Weibo, 45.9% discussed educational equity. The public positively believed that the policy of double reduction could effectively solve the long-standing phenomenon of unequal distribution of educational resources.
 For negative topics, the prominent topic public mentioned about is policy influences on Weibo. Some parents complained about hard to get tuition fees back phenomenon after the double reduction policy's crackdown on tutoring institutions. And some parents believed double reduction policy was just a product of the Chinese government to encourage fertility. 
 On Zhihu, parents' comments were highly opposed to the double reduction policy. They argued that the policy did not decrease parents' demand for tutoring classes but only caused higher prices and even created a larger educational resource gap. In addition, parents believed that competition among students still existed and the closure of private institutes could create more significant parental pressure in supervising children's academic performance.

Influences on Chinese Tutoring Industry 
About 15 million people in China were employed in off-campus education and training before the policy published. After the Double Reduction policy was implemented, 10 million people experienced unemployment. New Oriental Education Technology Group Co., Ltd. is a prominent player in the Chinese tutoring industry. Its stock price hit its “lowest point of 1.68 in August 2021”. Based on the purpose of cut costs and minimize economic losses, New Oriental Education also cut staff and stopped shifting its business focus from K-12 education consulting to quality-oriented education.  Overall, the tutoring industry shrunk considerably. The number of offline tutoring institutions decreased by 83.8 percent, while online tutoring institutions decreased by 84.1 percent. The tutoring industry became highly fungible because schools offered a wealth of learning resources in school and 91% of student attend those activities.

See also 
 Tiger parenting
 Tutoring
 Education in China
 Compulsory education

References 

Social issues in China
Public policy in China 
Education in China